Wajid District is a district in the southwestern Bakool region of Somalia. Its capital is Wajid.

References

External links
 Districts of Somalia
 Administrative map of Wajid District

Districts of Somalia

Bakool